Frauengefängnis (released in the US as Barbed Wire Dolls and in the UK as Caged Women) is a 1975 Swiss horror film directed by Jesús Franco. It is part of the women in prison cycle of violent sexploitation films that flourished in the 1970s and early 1980s.

When originally submitted for release in 1976, the British Board of Film Classification rejected it. It was only passed the following year after extensive cuts.

Plot

Cult director Jesús Franco's Swiss-West German production is a women's prison tale, with Lina Romay as Maria who is jailed after killing her father, played by director Jesús Franco, who tries to rape her. Lesbian wardens, torture, nudity, sex, insanity, conspiracy and a downbeat twist ending round out the formula.

The women's prison, based on an isolated island, is run by a man who impersonates a doctor, Carlos Costa. In fact, he is a killer who murdered the actual doctor of that name, whose name he then assumed. Assisting him is a monocled lesbian woman known only as The Wardress who regulates the prison with an iron fist. The Wardress reads Nazi volumes such as Albert Speer's history of the Third Reich as leisure reading. She wears jackboots and tight shorts under a white shirt in some scenes. In other scenes she wears a see-through black sheer fabric top.

Due to the practice of placing prisoners in isolation and torturing them (for example, via chaining them naked to a wall just out of reach of food, or placing them naked on a wire-frame bed where they receive electric shocks), several prisoners in the past have died. The current authorities in charge of the prison have concealed this by claiming these prisoners died of heart failure; but they are reaching the point where any more reported 'heart failures' will appear suspicious to the authorities on the mainland.

Cast
Lina Romay – Maria da Guerra
Monica Swinn – The Wardress (credited as Monika Swinn)
Paul Muller – Carlos Costa (credited as Paul Müller)
Ramon Ardid (Raymond Hardy) – José (credited as Ray Hardy)
Roger Darton – Milton Warren
Ronald Weiss – The Warden
Martine Stedil – Bertha Contrini
Eric Falk – Nestor
Peggy Markoff – Pompadour (as credited as Peggy Markhoff)
Nathalie Mann
Denis Torre
Jesús Franco – Maria's Father (uncredited)
Beni Cardoso – Rosaria Cortina

References

External links
 

1975 films
1975 horror films
Swiss horror films
West German films
German horror films
1970s French-language films
Films directed by Jesús Franco
Sexploitation films
Women in prison films
1970s exploitation films
French-language Swiss films
1970s German films